David Mark Silk  (born January 1, 1958)  is an American former professional ice hockey player. His professional career, which spanned 13 years, included 249 NHL regular season games with the Boston Bruins, Winnipeg Jets, Detroit Red Wings and New York Rangers. Silk is arguably most famous for being a member of the 1980 US Men's hockey team that won the gold medal at the Olympics in Lake Placid. He is the cousin of former NHL and Boston Bruins player Mike Milbury.

Amateur career
Silk was born in Scituate, Massachusetts, and raised in Scituate and Cohasset, Massachusetts. He attended Thayer Academy in Braintree, where he scored 85 points in his first season. He then moved to Boston University where he became teammates and lifelong friends with future Miracle on Ice members Mike Eruzione, Jim Craig, and Jack O'Callahan. Silk was a dominating force for the Boston University Terriers hockey team, earning all-tournament, athlete of the week, and First- Team-All- New England honors. He won the NCAA Championship in 1978 with Boston University, and was awarded New England Rookie of the Year 1976–1977.

Professional career
Drafted 59th overall by the New York Rangers in the 1978 NHL Entry Draft, Silk signed a contract with the Rangers on March 3, 1980, days after the Olympic gold medal game. He spent the next three seasons as a Ranger, playing mostly at right wing and center. Silk realized a childhood dream when he was traded to the Boston Bruins in 1983. He was claimed off waivers by the Detroit Red Wings the following season. After becoming a free agent in 1985, Silk signed with the Winnipeg Jets, finished his NHL career, and moved on to Germany for the 1986–87 season.

Post playing career
Silk retired from hockey in 1991, returning to his alma mater Boston University where he served as the assistant men's hockey coach while attending BU's graduate school of management.
Silk has been inducted into the United States Hockey Hall of Fame, United States Olympic Hall of Fame, Boston University Hall of Fame, Sports Illustrated, Sportsman of the Year, and also inducted into the Massachusetts Hockey Hall of Fame (NHL + Amateur).

While attending Boston University, Silk earned both an undergraduate degree and a Masters of Business Administration degree and is a Director of Institutional Sales in Boston.  When asked if Silk still ties up the skates he said "I skate maybe once or twice a year for a charity event.  I can’t say I miss it.  I’m content.  I’m good friends with former teammates Jack O’Callahan and also with Jack Hughes and Ralph Cox, who were the last two cuts from the team that year.  The friendships, like I said, are the most important things for me to ever come out of my time in hockey" (Carroll).

In popular culture
Rick Dano played Silk in the 1981 TV movie Miracle on Ice.

Bobby Hanson played him in the 2004 Disney film Miracle.  Hanson played his college hockey at Boston University, where Silk, Jack O'Callahan, and Mike Eruzione had played.  After college, Hanson played professional hockey in Europe, before a knee injury ended his career.

Awards and achievements

Career statistics

Regular season and playoffs

International

References

External links

Carroll, Robert.  "Dave Silk Reflects on Golden Days Playing Hockey".  Boston Globe, March 11, 2004. 9 October 2006. <http://boston.com/sports/hockey>
"Dave Silk".  1987 NHL Amateur Draft.  9 October 2006. <http://www.Hockeydraftcentral.com/1978/78059.html>
"Dave Silk".  Boston University Hall of Fame.  9 October 2006. <https://web.archive.org/web/20081005113436/http://goterriers.cstv.com/hallfame/silk-dave.html>
Thompson, Harry. "Bay Stater Silk Spun Dream Career Close to Home".  USA Hockey Magazine, February, 2005. 9 October 2006.  <http://usahockeymagazine.com>

1958 births
1980 US Olympic ice hockey team
American men's ice hockey right wingers
Binghamton Whalers players
Boston Bruins players
Boston University Terriers men's ice hockey players
Detroit Red Wings players
Hershey Bears players
Ice hockey players from Massachusetts
Ice hockey players at the 1980 Winter Olympics
Living people
Maine Mariners players
Medalists at the 1980 Winter Olympics
New Haven Nighthawks players
New York Rangers draft picks
New York Rangers players
Olympic gold medalists for the United States in ice hockey
People from Scituate, Massachusetts
Sherbrooke Canadiens players
Sportspeople from Plymouth County, Massachusetts
Thayer Academy alumni
Tulsa Oilers (1964–1984) players
Winnipeg Jets (1979–1996) players
NCAA men's ice hockey national champions